Matthias Klemm (born 8 May 1941 in Bromberg, Bydgoszcz) is a German painter and graphic artist.
 
Prior to 1989, his work focused mostly on criticism of East Germany and Christian themes. In 1989 he formed a personal friendship with Rudolf Otto Wiemer.

In 1990 came his creation of graphical diary pages depicting the peaceful revolution in East Germany during the fall of 1989. During that time he created many works that became symbols for the peaceful revolution and were used for some time by the opposition movements, being shown in churches or seen on the streets in Leipzig and other cities.

Klemm currently lives in Leipzig and works as a freelance painter and graphic artist.

Some of his work is in public and private ownership in the following countries: Germany, Switzerland, Poland, Norway, Finland, Liechtenstein and Netherlands.

Description of his work

His works spans a broad range and mixes different techniques. Most important for him are:

collage
rollage
lithography
Walztechnik
work on building structures e.g. churches, hospitals etc. on which his paintings and designs can be found across Germany
work involving wood structures and glass

Noteworthy fusions of techniques:
Wax technique with Walztechnik, which he uses to create work of portraits, among other of Johannes Brahms, Kurt Masur, Riccardo Chailly, Herbert Blomstedt and Woody Allen.

List of important graphic cycles 

1970 Meißner Te Deum - 20 pieces
1974 Die letzten Tage der Schöpfung
since 1983 Matthäuspassion
since 1986 Flugbilder–Gesichtsfelder
1988 Schmetterlingszyklus" - 4 pieces
1990 Tagebuchblätter - 32 pieces
1992 Erfaßt, geschunden und doch lebendig - 18 pieces
2000 J. S. Bach Zyklus - 4 pieces
2000 Augen-Blicke - 8 pieces
since 2003 Rufer und Gliederpuppe - 8 pieces

List of selected references his work 

Hanisch, Günter: Auftrag und Anliegen . 13 Künstlerwege hier und heute. Berlin 1975, Evangelische Verlagsanstalt, 8 Abb.
Puttkammer, Joachim: „Gedanken zu einem Künstler“, in: Der Sonntag, 2.5.1982, 1 Abb.
„DDR-Kunstharen Mathias Klem i Hareid Kunstlag, Første separatutstilling fra DDR i Norge, in: Vest Posten 29.9.1982.
„Hareid først i Norge med kunstutstilling fra DDR – Menbiletkunstnaren sjølv er nelcta utreiselvoye“, in: Sunnmørsposten, 30.9.1982, 2 Abb.
Ziese, Alexander: Allgemeines Lexikon der Kunstschaffenden in der bildenden und gestaltenden Kunst im ausgehenden XX. Jahrhundert, Band 4, Forschungsinstitut Bildender Künstler, S. 281/ 3 Abb.
Tervonen, H.: „Elämä on sekä ohgelma että mahdollisuus, in: Kotimaa, 7.8.1987, 3 Abb.
Who is who in der Bundesrepublik Deutschland IV. Ausgabe 1996, S. 1589.
Kataloge Kunstsammlungen Sparkasse: Die Leipziger Schule, Band 3 (Abb. S. 82), Band 5 (Abb. S. 40), Band 6 (Abb. S. 52), Kurzfilm im MDR „Glaubwürdig – der Künstler Matthias Klemm“, 2000.
Mayer, Thomas: „Die Milchtöpfe tun ihm immer noch weh. Matthias Klemm – ein Künstler, der sich einmischt.“, LVZ, 8.5.2001.
Gebhardt, Kristin: Vermischen, Einmischen, Widerstehen. Der Leipziger Künstler Matthias Klemm. Wissenschaftliche Arbeit im Fach Kunstgeschichte an der Universität Leipzig 2002.
"Matthias Klemm - Arbeit aus 4 Jahrzehnten", Passage Verlag Leipzig, 2006,

Selected exhibitions 

1971 and 1985 Dresden, Kreuzkirche
1979 Leipzig, Thomaskirche
1982 Bautzen, Dom
1982 Norway, Hareid-Kunstverein
1986 Switzerland, Bern, Pauluskirche
1989 Magdeburg, Dom
1989 Frankfurt, Bundesgartenschau
1990 Netherlands, Den Haag, Galerie Ruach
1994 Leipzig, Bacharchiv
1996 Leipzig, Gewandhaus
1999 Leipzig, Nikolaikirche
2006 Leipzig, Galerie Bösenberg
2007 Dresden, Kreuzkirche (200. solo exhibition)

Sources

External links
Matthias Klemm's website
Exhibition Villa Bösenberg
Exhibition VOR ORT OST

20th-century German painters
20th-century German male artists
German male painters
21st-century German painters
21st-century German male artists
1941 births
Living people